The Toulouse is a French breed of large domestic goose, originally from the area of Toulouse in south-western France. Birds bred in the United Kingdom and United States exclusively for showing may be still larger, and have a somewhat different conformation.

History 

The history of the Toulouse is a long one, going back at least to 1555. It was reared for meat and for foie gras.

Some were brought to the United Kingdom in the 1840s by Edward Smith-Stanley, 13th Earl of Derby, who was at that time president of the Zoological Society of London. There it was bred for considerably greater weight; the British breed standard dates from 1865. 

Some of these heavier British birds were later exported to North America. The Toulouse was included in the first Standard of Perfection of the American Poultry Association in 1874. It is reared principally in the upper Midwest, where its good tolerance of cold weather is an advantage.

Characteristics 

The Toulouse generally has a placid disposition. In France weights are usually in the range .

Use 

The production strain of the Toulouse goose was bred to be fast-growing, gaining weight rapidly when there is an abundance of food and no room for exercise. It may be reared for its meat, for goose fat, or for foie gras. Exhibition strains are slow-growing. Geese of the type without dewlaps lay 25–40 extra-large white eggs per year, while geese of the dewlap type lay 20–35. The birds may also be a source of goose down.

References

Further reading 

 Joseph Batty (1996). Domesticated Ducks and Geese, third edition. Elsted, Midhurst: Beech Publishing House. .

Goose breeds
Goose breeds originating in France
Animal breeds on the RBST Watchlist